

Winners and nominees

1980s

1990s

2000s

2010s

Records 
 Most awarded actor: Ernesto Laguardia and Osvaldo Benavides, 2 times.
 Most awarded actor (ever winner): Osvaldo Benavides, 2 times.
 Most nominated actor: Ernesto Laguardia and Eleazar Gómez with 4 nominations.
 Most nominated actor without a win: Eduardo Palomo with 3 nominations.
 Youngest winner: Osvaldo Benavides, 17 years old.
 Youngest nominee: Alejandro Speitzer, 16 years old.
 Oldest winner: Guy Ecker, 40 years old.
 Oldest nominee: René Strickler, 36 years old.
 Actors winning after short time: Ernesto Laguardia by (Quinceañera, 1988) and (Flor y canela, 1989), 2 consecutive years.
 Actors winning after long time: Osvaldo Benavides by (María la del barrio, 1996) and (Te sigo amando, 1998), 2 years difference.
 Actors winning this category, despite having been as a main villain: Rodrigo Vidal (Dos mujeres, un camino, 1994)
 Actors was nominated in this category, despite having played as a main villain: Rafael Rojas (Baila conmigo, 1993)
Foreign winning actors:
 Guy Ecker from Brazil
 Osvaldo de León from United States
 Santiago Achaga from Argentina

References

External links 
TVyNovelas at esmas.com
TVyNovelas Awards at the univision.com

Young Lead Actors
Young
Young
Awards for young actors